Maracaibo Province or Maracaybo Province from 1676 to 1824 was a province of the Spanish Empire. It resulted from a merger of the former Province of Mérida (1622 - 1676) with the territory of Maracaibo.

In 1777 Captaincy General of Venezuela was created and the province was part of it.
In 1786 Barinas Province was created from western parts of Maracaibo.

Provinces of the Spanish Empire
Colonial Venezuela
1676 establishments in the Spanish Empire